Pansy Chan is a female squash player who represents Hong Kong at international level.

Awards
2010:
Hong Kong Junior Sports Stars Awards, Sports Federation & Olympic Committee of Hong Kong, China
ZESPRI Outstanding Junior Athlete Awards (3rd Quarter 2010), Hong Kong Sports Institute
2012:
Hong Kong Outstanding Teens Award
Hong Kong Island Excellent Students Award
BOCHK Outstanding Athlete Award (squash)
2013:
Sports for Hope Foundation Outstanding Junior Athlete Awards (1st Quarter 2013), Hong Kong Sports Institute
Sports for Hope Foundation Outstanding Junior Athlete Awards (3rd Quarter 2013), Hong Kong Sports Institute
BOCHK Outstanding Athlete Award (squash)

Sports achievements
2010:
Asian Junior Squash Individual Championships - GU15 Champion
Hong Kong Junior Squash Open - GU15 - First Runner-Up
Hong Kong Junior Squash Championships - GU15 Champion
2011:
Australia National Junior Series - GU15 Champion
Pioneer Junior Open - GU17 - First Runner-Up
 Dutch Junior Open- GU17 - First Runner-Up
Hong Kong Junior Open Squash - GU17 Champion
2012:
Hong Kong Junior Open Squash - GU17 Champion
Korea Open - Women's Open - 2nd Runner-up
Inter-School Individual Squash Competition - Girls A Grade - Champion
Hong Kong Junior Squash Championships - GU19 - 2nd Runner-Up
BUFF Singapore Squash Open - GU17 - Champion
2013:
Asian Junior Squash Team Championship - Silver Medal
Women's World Junior Team Squash Championships - Bronze Medal
Asian Youth Games - Squash (Women's Individual) - Silver Medal
Asian Youth Games - Squash (Women's Team) - Silver Medal

References

External links 

New year, new glories, SCMP, 03-Sep-2012

Hong Kong female squash players
Living people
1996 births
Hong Kong people